The 22nd Central American and Caribbean Games were held November 14–30, 2014 in Veracruz, Mexico. The Games featured 36 sports, with most occurred in Veracruz, but some occurred in Boca del Río, Xalapa, Córdoba, Tuxpan, and Coatzacoalcos

Sports

 Cycling
 BMX (2)
 Mountain biking (2)
 Road (4)
 Track (10)

 Gymnastics
 Artistic gymnastics 
 Rhythmic gymnastics 
 Trampoline

Nations
The following 31 countries took part in this edition.

Medal table

Broadcasting 
  ESPN Deportes
  Televisa
  Claro Sports
  Señal Colombia
  Canal 4
  Canal 11
  Guatevisión
  Radiotelevisión de Veracruz
   Telemundo and WIPR-TV
  TVes
  Tele Rebelde
  SportsMax

References

External links 

 
Central American and Caribbean Games
Central American and Caribbean Games
Central American And Caribbean Games, 2014
Central American and Caribbean Games
Central American and Caribbean Games
Central American and Caribbean Games
Multi-sport events in Mexico
Central American and Caribbean Games